Digby Tantam (born 15 March 1948) is a British psychiatrist and Professor of Psychotherapy.  He is currently Clinical Professor of Psychotherapy at the University of Sheffield; a practitioner of psychodynamic psychiatry, and was a prolific advocate of electroconvulsive therapy in the 1980s.  More recently a consultant psychiatrist and psychotherapist at the Sheffield Care Trust; and a partner at Dilemma Consultancy Ltd. His main research interests are social and emotional wellbeing, emotional contagion, nonverbal communication, applied philosophy and autism spectrum disorders.

Career

Tantam was educated at Rokeby School and St Paul's School in London, then at Oxford University.

He has been providing a clinical service for people with autistic spectrum disorders since 1980, when he was awarded a training fellowship from the Medical Research Council (United Kingdom) to study Asperger syndrome. He created the Sheffield Asperger Assessment Service in 1995 when he moved to Sheffield from the University of Warwick, where he had been appointed to the first chair in psychotherapy in the UK. 

Tantam is an Emeritus Professor at The School of Health and Related Research at The University of Sheffield. 

He has written 70 peer reviewed papers, 32 book chapters and 36 other publications, 7 websites, 5 videotapes, and 9 books (1 translated into Polish, Japanese, and Arabic).

He is married to Professor Emmy van Deurzen.

Bibliography

Books
Goldberg, D.P. & Tantam, D. (eds.) (1990) The Public Health Impact of Mental Disorder, Hogrefe and Huber, Bern, 238pp
Greenberg, M., Shergill, S., Szmukler, G., Tantam, D. (2002) Narratives in Psychiatry, Jessica Kingsley
Greenberg, M., Szmukler, G & Tantam, D. (1986) Making Sense of Psychiatric Cases, Oxford: Oxford University Press
Strang, J., Donmall, M., Webster, A.,  Abbey, J., Tantam, D. (1991) A Bridge Not Far Enough: Community Drug Teams and Doctors in the North Western Region, ISDD Research Monograph 3. London: Institute for the Study of Drug Dependence
Tantam, D. (1988, 1991, 2000) A Mind of One's Own; National Autistic Society: London, 35pp, 1988. Polish translation 1996 in Autistic Child 4, 1, 4-19 and 4,2, 4-13, Japanese translation, Arabic translation 2005
Tantam, D. and Birchwood, M. (eds. 1994) College Seminars in Psychology and Social Sciences, London:  Gaskell Press
Tantam, D., Duncan, A. and Appleby, L. (eds. 1996) Psychiatry for the Developing World, Gaskell Press
Tantam, D. (ed. 1998) Clinical Topics in Psychotherapy, Gaskell Press
Tantam, D. (2002) Psychotherapy and Counselling in Practice, Cambridge University Press
Tantam, D. (2012) Autism Spectrum Disorders Through the Life Span, Jessica Kingsley Publishers 550pp
Tantam, D. (2014) Emotional Well-being and Mental Health: A Guide for Counsellors & Psychotherapists, SAGE Publications Ltd

References

External Links 

 Google Scholar profile

1948 births
Living people
Academics of the University of Sheffield
Academics of the University of Warwick
British psychiatrists
Alumni of the University of Oxford
People educated at St Paul's School, London
Harvard University alumni